Alamsjah Ratoe Perwiranegara (December 25, 1925 in Kotabumi, North Lampung, Lampung, Dutch East Indies – January 8, 1998 in Jakarta, Indonesia) was an Indonesian military general who served as State Secretary Minister, Coordinating Minister of People's Welfare, Minister of Religious Affairs, and Ambassador of Indonesia to the Netherlands.

Education and the school 
Alamsjah first basic education in Cape Coral then continue in Lampung Gakuin (junior level) and finally completed in LPPU school level (high school).

During the Japanese occupation (1942–1945) was following military education Gyu Gun. After Indonesian independence August 17, 1945, Alamsjah sent to India to follow the military science education at the Senior Officer Course at Mhow and then continued his education at the General Staff College at Fort Leavenworth, Kansas, United States.

Military and political career 
The last military rank achieved before entry into the cabinet as Secretary of State was a lieutenant general — Men / Army (treasury). Alamsjah also became Indonesian Ambassador for the Netherlands in 1972–1974. Due to his health condition, Alamsjah replaced by Lieutenant Sutopo Sudarsono. He was then appointed Deputy Chairman of the Supreme Advisory Council (DPA).

In the Third Development Cabinet (1978–1983) was appointed Alamsjah Minister of Religious Affairs and the Fourth Development Cabinet (1983–1988) he served as Coordinating Minister for People's Welfare.

Alamsjah had left the world of politics in the years 1989–1991 due to coronary heart disease which finally carried out bypass surgery in Mount Elizabeth Hospital, Singapore.

After convening Non-Aligned Summit in Indonesia in 1992, Alamsjah appointed Roving Ambassador of the Non-Aligned for Middle East affairs (1992–1995).

Retirement and death 
In retirement from politics Alamsjah lead a company named officer Penanggan queen and spends his time at his home in South Jakarta Housing area.

On 18 November 1997 Alamsjah got a severe asthma attack and was treated in Hospital MMC, Kuningan, Jakarta and died on January 8, 1998. Alamsjah's military burial with military ceremony wal led by Gen. Wiranto in Libingan ng mga Bayani Sky View.

Family 
His father was named Baharuddin Yoesoef (1885–1929) and his mother, Siti Mariam (1892–1935). Alamsjah was the youngest of nine children; brothers' names are Bermawi Ahmad, Siti Arbaeen, Siti Hafsyah, Siti Amenah, Mohammad Adenan, Siti Rohaya, Mohammad Sirod and Marsiyem.

On January 12, 1952, Alamsjah married with Siti Maemunah Alamsjah, who was born in Palembang on April 15, 1930. The couple was blessed with five children, namely Joesoef Haery Utama Alamsjah, Muhammad Ali Muda Eddy Alamsjah, Muhammad Soleh Bingsiwijaya Alamsjah, Siti Mariam  Alamsjah, and Siti Hafsah Alamsjah. Of his children, and his wife obtained Alamsjah 12 grandchildren. One of them was Abdul Sattar who was born on (September 30, 1984) of the pair Siti Mariam and Dr. Merry Alamsjah Abadi Soetisna, MSI.

Several grandchildren Alamsjah the other of which is Amot Syamsuri Muda, who later was named small Amot (25 April 1987) were born to Atty Alamsjah and Ir. Agus Bakhtiar and Ahmad Shukri (3 November 1988) of Muhammad Soleh Bingsiwijaya Alamsjah and Ginna. Alamsjah's second son (Muhammad Ali Muda Eddy Alamsjah) and his wife (Hartanti Yuniari Soeharto) gave him two grandchildren, they are named Siti Fatimah Hapsari Ayuningdyah Ariswari Alamsjah and Muhamad Yusuf Baharuddin Satria Muda Alamsjah.

The eldest grandson of the couple's son Joesoef Haery Utama Alamsjah, M.Arch and Ir. Dewi Arimbi Soeharto who is the daughter of dr. H.Soeharto & Sprott Tedjasukmana Suharto, Siti Maimunah is Jibrilia, Abdullah M. Abi Alamsjah, Siti Khadijah Mikhailia Tikha Alamsjah, Abdurahman M. Dumas, and M. Abdurahim Khairy Alamsjah. Alamsjah eldest son also followed his father's footsteps in service to the country as the people's representatives in the DPR / MPR since 1992 and had served on the DPP Golkar and ICMI Center.

References

Ambassadors of Indonesia to the Netherlands
People from Lampung
Lampung people
1925 births
1998 deaths